WBWV is a Contemporary Christian formatted broadcast radio station licensed to Beckley, West Virginia, serving the Beckley/Oak Hill/Hinton area.  WBWV is owned and operated by Slingshot Broadcasting Corporation.

References

External links
 

BWV